Aldershot Military Stadium is a sports complex in Aldershot, England comprising a combined football and athletics stadium and a smaller adjoined rugby stadium. It is the home ground of the British Army's football and rugby teams, Aldershot, Farnham and District Athletic Club and the Army Athletics Association.

Location
The stadia are located to the north of Aldershot just off the A325, the main road to Farnborough. It is sited in the Military Town, adjoining all the military buildings including married quarters and barracks.

Stadia

The Military Stadium
The Military Stadium has a main stand with a seated capacity of 1,128. Also sited are the changing facilities, VIP lounge and control room.

It comprises a fully floodlit eight-lane synthetic athletics track with full field event facilities. During the football season the infield is converted to a football pitch with the throwing disciplines moved outside of the stadium.

Rugby Stadium

The Rugby Stadium has a smaller 500-seat spectator stand with full changing facilities and is fully floodlit. During the 2022 Challenge Cup, the ground hosted the first Army-Navy interservice derby in the competition, which saw the Navy win in golden point extra time.

History
The Military Stadium has been the home of Army run football since 1912.

Events
Every year the stadium plays host to the Army FA Cup Final.

See also
Army Football Association
Army Rugby Union
Army Rugby League

References

Sports venues in Hampshire
Military in Aldershot
Sport in the British Army
Sport in Aldershot
Buildings and structures in Aldershot